The 1918 Oklahoma gubernatorial election was held on November 5, 1918, and was a race for Governor of Oklahoma. Democrat  James B. A. Robertson defeated Republican Horace G. McKeever.  Also on the ballot was Patrick S. Nagle of the Socialist Party.

Democratic primary
James B. A. Robertson, a former judge who had lost in the Democratic gubernatorial primary in 1914, defeated six other candidates to win the nomination, including future governor 'Alfalfa Bill' Murray.

Primary Results

Republican primary
In a race where all five candidates achieved significant vote percentages, Horace G. McKeever came out on top.

Results

Results

References

1918
Gubernatorial
Okla